Undiscovered Soul is the second solo studio album from Richie Sambora the guitarist from New Jersey band Bon Jovi. The album was released on February 23, 1998, and is more experimental than his earlier release Stranger in This Town. The album was produced by Don Was.

Release and promotion
The album charted at #174 on The Billboard 200 and #24 on the UK Albums Chart. The lead single "Hard Times Come Easy" charted at #39 on the Mainstream rock chart and #37 in the UK, the second single "In It for Love" charted at #58 on the UK Singles Chart. The title track "Undiscovered Soul" and "Made in America" were also released as singles.

Music videos were made for the first two singles.

Track listing

1997 Japanese Version
This version was released only in Japan and contains a slightly different running order and alternate versions of songs. This release features different artwork than the final 1998 album worldwide release.

1998 Tour Edition
This Japan-only limited edition comes with a bonus CD including six live recordings. All the Tracks are from the San Diego show in 1992.

Personnel

Audio Mixers: Ed Cherney, Rail Jon Rogut, Bob Clearmountain
Recording information: Ocean Way Recording; Record One; Record Plant; Voodoo Lounge
Photographers: Chris McCann, Dan Chavkin, Greg Allen
Unknown Contributor Role: Richard Supa
Arranger: Richie Sambora
Richie Sambora - lead vocals, electric and acoustic guitars, handclaps
Mark Goldenberg - guitar, handclaps
Wayne Hood - guitar, strings arrangement
David Paich - electric piano, synthesizer
Greg Phillinganes - piano, background vocals
Chuck Leavell - piano, electric piano
Steven Tyler - harmonica on "If God Was a Woman"
James "Hutch" Hutchinson - bass (on tracks 1, 2, 4, 5, 6, 8, 11, 12), background vocals, handclaps
Don Was - bass, wurlitzer, handclaps
Pino Palladino - fretless bass
Kenny Aronoff - drums, percussion, handclaps
Paulinho da Costa - percussion
Rami Jaffee - hammond b3 organ, accordion, handclaps
Billy Preston - hammond b3 organ, background vocals
Robbie Buchanan - synthesizer
Jamie Muhoberac - synthesizer programming
Myrna Smith, Portia Griffin, Isabella Lento, Sweet Pea Atkinson, Harry Bowens, Hook - background vocals

Charts

Album

Singles

References

1998 albums
Richie Sambora albums
Albums produced by Don Was
Mercury Records albums